The Naked Truth (German: Die nackte Wahrheit) is a 1932 American German language comedy film directed by Karl Anton and starring Jenny Jugo, Oskar Karlweis and Trude Hesterberg. It is the German version of the 1929 film Nothing but the Truth. It was also known by the alternative title of Heut' küsst Paris

It was shot at the Joinville Studios in Paris, where many of Paramount Pictures' multiple-language version were made. A separate French version was also produced.

Cast
Jenny Jugo
Oskar Karlweis
Trude Hesterberg
Otto Wernicke
Tibor Halmay
Hans Adalbert Schlettow
Alexander Köckert
Marita Ángeles
Harry Hardt
Jaro Fürth
Harry Nestor

References

External links

American comedy films
1932 comedy films
Films directed by Karl Anton
Paramount Pictures films
Films shot at Joinville Studios
American multilingual films
American black-and-white films
1932 multilingual films
1930s American films